The 1938 Kent State Golden Flashes football team was an American football team that represented Kent State University in the Ohio Athletic Conference (OAC) during the 1938 college football season. In its fourth season under head coach Donald Starn, Kent State compiled a 6–2 record (3–2 against OAC opponents) and outscored all opponents by a total of 174 to 69.  The team opened the season with five consecutive victories, including back-to-back shutouts over Alfred Holbrook (49–0) and Buffalo (54–0). The team's 54 points scored against Buffalo was the most in school history to that point and also included a school record for most points in a quarter (27 points in the third quarter). The team then lost two of its last three games, including a 7–3 loss in the 10th match in its rivalry with Bowling Green.

Schedule

References

Kent State
Kent State Golden Flashes football seasons
Kent State Golden Flashes football